Valeene is an unincorporated community in Southeast Township, Orange County, in the U.S. state of Indiana.

History
Valeene was laid out in 1837. A post office was established at Valeene in 1828, and remained in operation until it was discontinued in 1953.

Geography

References

Unincorporated communities in Indiana
Unincorporated communities in Orange County, Indiana